Franklin Middleton Jr. (born October 28, 1960) is a former American football running back in the National Football League who played for the Indianapolis Colts and San Diego Chargers. He played college football for the Florida A&M Rattlers.

References

1960 births
Living people
American football running backs
Seattle Seahawks players
Indianapolis Colts players
San Diego Chargers players
Florida A&M Rattlers football players